The following is an incomplete list of notable individuals who converted to Catholicism from a different religion or no religion.

Converts

A
 Hank Aaron: American professional baseball right fielder who played 23 seasons in Major League Baseball (MLB), from 1954 through 1976; regarded as one of the greatest baseball players of all time. He and his wife first became interested in the faith after the birth of their first child. A friendship with a Catholic priest later helped lead to Hank and his wife's conversion in 1959. He was known to frequently read Thomas à Kempis' 15th-century book The Imitation of Christ, which he kept in his locker.
 Greg Abbott: 48th Governor of Texas
 Creighton Abrams: U.S. Army General, converted while commanding US forces in Vietnam
 Vladimir Abrikosov: Russian who became an Eastern-rite priest; husband to Anna Abrikosova
 Anna Abrikosova: Russian convert to Eastern-rite Catholicism who was imprisoned by the Soviets
 John Adams: beatified person and Catholic martyr
 Mortimer J. Adler: American philosopher, educator, and popular author; converted from agnosticism, after decades of interest in Thomism
 Afonso I of Kongo: African king; although politically motivated he became quite pious
 Sohrab Ahmari: Iranian-American columnist, editor, and author of nonfiction books. He is currently the op-ed editor of the New York Post, a contributing editor of The Catholic Herald, and a columnist for First Things
 Leo Allatius: Greek theologian
 Fanny Allen: daughter of Ethan Allen; became a nun
 Thomas William Allies: English writer
Svetlana Alliluyeva: daughter of Joseph Stalin
 Mother Mary Alphonsa: daughter of Nathaniel Hawthorne, born "Rose Hawthorne"; became a nun and founder of St. Rose's Free Home for Incurable Cancer
 Veit Amerbach: Lutheran theologian and humanist before conversion
 William Henry Anderdon: English Jesuit and writer
 Władysław Anders: General in the Polish Army; later a politician with the Polish government-in-exile in London
 G. E. M. Anscombe: British analytical philosopher and theologian who introduced the term "consequentialism" into the English language. Wife of Peter Geach
 Francis Arinze: Nigerian Cardinal and Prefect of the Congregation for Divine Worship and the Discipline of the Sacraments
 Gavin Ashenden: English writer, broadcaster and theologian. Former Chaplain to the Queen and Episcopalian bishop.Received December 2019. 
 Audrey Assad: American singer-songwriter and contemporary Christian music artist who has since distanced herself from Catholicism and even Christianity.
 Thomas Aufield: English priest and martyr
 Augustine of Hippo: theologian, philosopher, and the bishop of Hippo Regius in Numidia, Roman North Africa. His writings influenced the development of Western philosophy and Western Christianity, and he is viewed as one of the most important Church Fathers of the Latin Church in the Patristic Period. He was raised by a Catholic Mother, Monica, but joined the Manichean sect before converting and being baptized into the Catholic faith at the age of 31.

B
 Johann Christian Bach: composer; youngest son of Johann Sebastian Bach
 Thomas Bailey: royalist and controversialist; his father was Anglican bishop Lewis Bayly
 Beryl Bainbridge: English novelist
Bessie Anstice Baker, Australian writer and philanthropist, author of A Modern Pilgrim's Progress
 Francis Asbury Baker: American priest, missionary, and social worker; one of the founders of the Paulist Fathers in 1858
 Josephine Bakhita: Sudanese-born former slave; became a Canossian Religious Sister in Italy, living and working there for 45 years; in 2000 she was declared a saint
 Banine: French writer of Azeri descent
Daniel Barber: An American priest of the Episcopal Church before his conversion to Catholicism
 Maurice Baring: English intellectual, writer, and war correspondent
 Mark Barkworth: English Catholic priest, martyr, and beatified person
 Barlaam of Seminara: involved in the Hesychast controversy as an opponent to Gregory Palamas, possibly a revert
 Arthur Barnes: formerly an Anglican priest, who became a Catholic writer and the first Catholic chaplain of both Cambridge and Oxford Universities
 Edwin Barnes: formerly an Anglican bishop
 Joan Bartlett: foundress of the Servite Secular Institute
 James Roosevelt Bayley: first bishop of the Roman Catholic Archdiocese of Newark and eighth Archbishop of Baltimore
 Aubrey Beardsley: English illustrator and author; before his death, converted to Catholicism and renounced his erotic drawings
 Francis J. Beckwith: American philosopher, Baylor University professor, and former president of the Evangelical Theological Society; technically a revert
 Jean Mohamed Ben Abdejlil: Moroccan scholar and Roman Catholic priest
 Benedict Mar Gregorios: Metropolitan Archbishop of Trivandrum, 1955-1994
 Peter Benenson: founder of human rights group Amnesty International
 Robert Hugh Benson: English writer and theologian; son of an Archbishop of Canterbury
 Elizabeth Bentley: former Soviet spy who defected to the West; was converted by Archbishop Fulton J. Sheen
 Bernard Berenson: American art historian specializing in the Renaissance.
 Mary Kay Bergman: American voice actress
 Bernardo the Japanese: one of the first Japanese people to visit Europe
 Jiao Bingzhen: painter and astronomer
 Conrad Black: Canadian-born historian, columnist, UK peer, and convicted felon for fraud; his conviction was overturned subsequently on appeal
 Tony Blair: former Prime Minister of the United Kingdom; converted 22 December 2007, after stepping down as prime minister
 Andrea Bocelli: Italian tenor
 Cherry Boone: daughter of devoutly evangelical Christian entertainer Pat Boone; she went public about her battle with anorexia nervosa
 John Wilkes Booth: 19th-century actor; assassin of President Abraham Lincoln; his sister Asia Booth asserted in her 1874 memoir that Booth, baptized an Episcopalian at age 14, had become a Catholic; for the good of the Church during a notoriously anti-Catholic time in American history, Booth's conversion was not publicized
 Robert Bork: American jurist and unsuccessful nominee to the United States Supreme Court; converted to Catholicism in 2003; his wife was a former Catholic nun
 Louis Bouyer: French theologian; converted to Catholicism in 1939
Jim Bowie: American pioneer, slave smuggler and trader, and soldier who played a prominent role in the Texas Revolution. Bowie was baptized in San Antonio on April 28, 1828, sponsored by the alcalde (chief administrator) of the town, Juan Martín de Veramendi, and his wife, Josefa Navarro. His conversion was to take advantage of a land grant
 John Randal Bradburne: warden of the leper colony at Mutoko, Rhodesia and a candidate for canonization 
 William Maziere Brady: Irish historian and journalist, formerly a Church of Ireland priest
 Elinor Brent-Dyer: English writer
 Alexander Briant: one of the Forty Martyrs of England and Wales
 John Broadhurst: formerly an Anglican bishop
Heywood Broun: sportswriter, columnist, author; was converted by Archbishop Fulton J. Sheen 
 George Mackay Brown: Scottish poet, author and dramatist from the Orkney Islands
 Sam Brownback: Governor of Kansas
 Orestes Brownson: American writer
 Dave Brubeck: American jazz musician
 Elizabeth Bruenig: American journalist working as an opinion writer for The Atlantic.
 David-Augustin de Brueys: French theologian and dramatist
 Ismaël Bullialdus: French astronomer; converted from Calvinism and became a Catholic priest
 Andrew Burnham: formerly an Anglican bishop
 John Ellis Bush: American politician, forty-third Governor of Florida
 Thomas Byles: priest who died serving others on the RMS Titanic

C
 Roy Campbell: South-African-born, English-based (later Portuguese-based) poet
 Edmund Campion: Jesuit martyr who wrote Decem Rationes, which denounced Anglicanism; one of the Forty Martyrs of England and Wales
 Alexis Carrel: French surgeon and biologist who was awarded the Nobel Prize in Physiology or Medicine in 1912
 Rianti Cartwright: Indonesian actress, model, presenter and VJ; two weeks before departure to the United States to get married, Rianti left the Muslim faith to become a baptized Catholic with the name Sophia Rianti Rhiannon Cartwright
 Kenneth Clark: British art historian, museum director, and broadcaster. Converted shortly before his death.
 Charles II of England, Scotland, and Ireland: King Charles signed a treaty with King Louis XIV in which he agreed to convert to Catholicism. His conversion occurred on his deathbed.
 G.K. Chesterton: British writer, journalist and essayist, known for his Christian apologetics Orthodoxy, Heretics and The Everlasting Man
 Christina, Queen of Sweden: seventeenth-century monarch
 Djibril Cissé: French international footballer
Wesley Clark: U.S. Army General; former Supreme Allied Commander Europe of NATO; candidate for Democratic nomination for President in 2004
 Buffalo Bill Cody: American soldier, bison hunter, and showman. Converted the day before his death
Stephen Colbert: American comedian, writer, actor, political commentator, and host of the Late Show with Stephen Colbert: he was raised in a religious household, later to depart to atheism in his youth. However, in his twenties, he returned, having a powerful conversion to Catholicism
 Emily Coleman: American-born writer; lifelong compulsive diary keeper
 Henry James Coleridge: son of John Taylor Coleridge; became a priest
 James Collinson: artist who briefly went back to Anglicanism in order to marry Christina Rossetti
 Constantine the African: Tunisian doctor who converted from Islam and became a Benedictine monk
 Tim Conway: American comedian; converted to Catholicism because he said he liked the way the Church is structured
 Gary Cooper: American actor who converted to the Church late in life, saying, "that decision I made was the right one"
 Frederick Copleston: English historian of philosophy and Jesuit priest
 Gerty Cori: Czech-American biochemist who became the third woman, and first American woman, to win a Nobel Prize in science, and the first woman to be awarded the Nobel Prize in Physiology or Medicine
 Richard Crashaw: English poet; son of a staunch anti-Catholic father

D
 Lorenzo Da Ponte: Italian writer and poet; converted from Judaism on his father's remarriage
 Kim Dae-jung President of South Korea: 2000 1998-2003; 2000 Nobel Peace Prize recipient
 Christopher Davenport: Recollect friar whose efforts to show that the Thirty-Nine Articles could be interpreted more in accordance with Catholic teaching caused controversy among fellow Catholics
 Dominique Dawes: Olympic gold medalist
 Christopher Dawson: British independent scholar, who wrote many books on cultural history and Christendom. Dawson has been called "the greatest English-speaking Catholic historian of the twentieth century". He converted to Catholicism in 1909
 Dorothy Day: social activist and pacifist; founder of the Catholic Worker movement; was raised nominally Episcopalian
 David-Augustin de Brueys: French theologian
 Regina Derieva: Russian poet
 Alfred Döblin: German expressionist novelist, best known for Berlin Alexanderplatz
 Catherine Doherty: Canadian pioneer of social justice; converted from Russian Christianity
 Diana Dors: actress who was once called a "wayward hussy" by the Archbishop of Canterbury, Geoffrey Fisher; in the 1970s she converted to Catholicism and had a Catholic funeral
 Ross Douthat: American conservative political analyst, blogger, author and opinion columnist at The New York Times
 David Paul Drach: French Talmudic scholar and librarian of the College of Propaganda in Rome
 Augusta Theodosia Drane: English writer and theologian, also known as Mother Francis Raphael, O.S.D
 John Dryden: English poet, literary critic, and playwright
 Avery Dulles: American Jesuit theologian, professor at Fordham University; son of former Secretary of State John Foster Dulles
 Michael Dummett: British Analytic philosopher who devised the Quota Borda system
 Faye Dunaway: American actress
 Joseph Dutton: veteran of the American Civil War who worked with Father Damien

E
 Dawn Eden: rock journalist of Jewish ethnicity; was agnostic, now a Catholic concerned with the moral values of chastity
 Martin Eisengrein: German theologian and polemicist
 Ulf Ekman: Swedish charismatic pastor and founder of the Livets Ord congregation of the Word of Faith movement in Uppsala, Sweden
 Black Elk: Oglala medicine man
 Veit Erbermann: German theologian and controversialist
 William Everson: Beat poet whose parents were Christian Scientists; took the name Brother Antoninus in the 18 years he spent as a Dominican
 Thomas Ewing: U.S. Senator from Ohio; served as Secretary of the Treasury and first Secretary of the Interior; foster brother of William Tecumseh Sherman

F
 Frederick William Faber: English theologian and hymnwriter
 Lola Falana: dancer and actress who became a Catholic evangelist after converting; founded The Lambs of God Ministry
 Fan Shouyi (or Luigi Fan): first known Chinese person to travel to Europe, return, and write an account of his travels. In 1717, he was ordained as a priest and would eventually be an interpreter for the Chinese emperor and as a missionary in his native China.
 Leonid Feodorov: exarch of the Russian Greek Catholic Church; Gulag survivor; beatified by Pope John Paul II
 Ronald Firbank: British novelist
 Sir Henry Fletcher, 3rd Baronet, of Hutton le Forest: converted and spent his last years in a monastery
 Kasper Franck: German theologian and controversialist
 Antonia Fraser: British historian, biographer and novelist; her parents converted when she was young
 Johann Jakob Froberger: German composer
 André Frossard: French journalist and essayist
 Georgiana Fullerton: English novelist; converted in 1846 when she was in her 30s
 Allan Fung: American politician

G
 Ivan Gagarin: Russian Jesuit and writer of aristocratic origin
 Maggie Gallagher: conservative activist; a founder of the National Organization for Marriage
 Mark Galli: American author, former editor of Christianity Today, and former Evangelical Protestant minister
 Peter Geach: English philosopher and professor of logic at the University of Leeds. Husband of Elizabeth Anscombe
 Edmund Gennings and John Gennings: brothers; Edmund was a priest and martyr who converted at sixteen; his death lead to John's conversion; John restored the English province of Franciscan friars
 Elizabeth Fox-Genovese: historian; founder of the Institute of Women's Studies; wife of Eugene D. Genovese
 Eugene D. Genovese: historian; was once an atheist and Marxist
 Fathia Ghali: daughter of King Fuad I of Egypt and his Queen, Nazli Sabri; in 1950, both mother and daughter converted to Catholicism from Islam; this enraged King Farouk, who forbade them from returning to Egypt; after his death, they asked President Anwar Sadat to restore their passports, which he did
 Vladimir Ghika: Romanian nobleman who became a Catholic monsignor and political dissident
 Richard Gilmour: bishop of the Roman Catholic Diocese of Cleveland
 Newt Gingrich: American politician; Speaker of the United States House of Representatives
 Rumer Godden: English author of Black Narcissus and the 1972 Whitbread Award winner The Diddakoi; converted to Catholicism in 1968, which inspired the book In This House of Brede
Jonathan Goodall: Anglican Bishop of Ebbsfleet from 2013 to 2021, converted in September 2021
 John Gother: English Roman Catholic convert, priest and controversialist
 John Willem Gran: former Bishop of Oslo; had been an atheist working in the film industry
 Graham Greene: British writer whose Catholicism influenced novels like The Power and the Glory, although in later life he once referred to himself as a "Catholic atheist"
 Wilton Daniel Gregory: American Archbishop of Washington, 2019–present
 Moritz Gudenus: German priest
 Alec Guinness: British actor, after whom the Catholic Association of Performing Arts (UK) named an award
 Ruffa Gutierrez: Filipina actress, model and former beauty queen; converted from Christianity to Islam back to Christianity

H
 Theodor Haecker: German writer, translator and cultural critic
 Kimberly Hahn: former Presbyterian; theologian, apologist and author of many books
 Scott Hahn: former Presbyterian minister; theologian, scripture scholar and author of many books
 Jeffrey Hamm: British fascist leader; converted by the renegade Catholic priest Fr. Clement Russell; succeeded Oswald Mosley as head of the British Union of Fascists
 Thomas Morton Harper: Jesuit priest, philosopher, theologian and preacher
 Chris Haw: theologian and author of numerous books, including From Willow Creek to Sacred Heart, which detailed his conversion away from evangelical Protestantism
 Anna Haycraft: raised in Auguste Comte's atheistic "church of humanity", but became a conservative Catholic in adulthood
 Bill Hayden: Australian politician and Governor-General of Australia, converted from atheism at age 85 after retirement from public office.
 Carlton J. H. Hayes: American ambassador to Spain; helped found the American Catholic Historical Association; co-chair of the National Conference of Christians and Jews
 Susan Hayward: Academy Award-winning American actress who helped found a church
 Isaac Hecker: founder of the Paulist Fathers
 Elisabeth Hesselblad: raised Lutheran; after her conversion, became a nun; beatified by Pope John Paul II on 9 April 2000; recognized by Yad Vashem in 2004 as one of the Righteous Among the Nations for her work in helping Jews during World War II
 Dietrich von Hildebrand: German theologian
 H.H. Holmes: Chicago serial killer portrayed in Erik Larson's The Devil in the White City; allegedly converted in Philadelphia's Moyamensing Prison, about a week before he was executed in 1896
 Walter Hooper: trustee and literary advisor of the estate of C.S. Lewis
 James Hope-Scott: English lawyer connected to the Oxford Movement
 Gerard Manley Hopkins: English poet and Catholic priest
 Deal Hudson: Philosopher, publisher, political activist; converted from Southern Baptist to Catholicism at age 34.
 Francis Hsu (Chen-Ping): third bishop of Hong Kong, and the first Chinese one; a convert from Methodism
 Arcadio Huang: Chinese Christian convert, and brought to Paris by the Missions étrangères. He took a pioneering role in the teaching of the Chinese language in France around 1715.
 Allen Hunt: American radio personality; former Methodist pastor
 E. Howard Hunt: American spy and novelist
 Reinhard Hütter: American theologian

I
 Laura Ingraham: American broadcaster and political commentator
 Princess Irene of the Netherlands: her conversion, related to her marrying a Carlist, became something of a national issue
 Vyacheslav Ivanov: poet and playwright associated with Russian symbolism; received into the Catholic Church in 1926
 Levi Silliman Ives: Episcopal Church of the USA Bishop of North Carolina

J
 James II of England: King of England and Ireland as James II, and King of Scotland as James VII, from 6 February 1685 until he was deposed in the Revolution of 1688. He was the last Catholic monarch of England, Scotland and Ireland; his reign is now remembered primarily for struggles over religious tolerance. He converted from Anglicanism to Catholicism in 1668 or 1669
 Bobby Jindal: American politician who served as the 55th Governor of Louisiana from 2008 to 2016; converted in his teens
 Gwen John: artist; Auguste Rodin's lover; after the relationship she had a religious conversion and did portraits of nuns
 Abby Johnson: former Planned Parenthood clinic director; converted to Catholicism in 2011, two years after her anti-abortion conversion in 2009
 Bobby Jones: Golf pioneer. Converted on his deathbed in 1971

 James Earl Jones: American actor who converted during his service in the U.S. Army
 Walter B. Jones: U.S. politician; Member of the United States House of Representatives
 Nirmala Joshi: Superior General of the Missionaries of Charity, 1997-2009
 Johannes Jørgensen: Danish writer, known for his biographies of Catholic saints
Ernst Jünger: decorated German soldier, author, and entomologist who became publicly known for his World War I memoir Storm of Steel. Converted shortly before his death at the age of 102

K
 Nicholas Kao Se Tseien: world's oldest priest
 Katharine, Duchess of Kent: first member of the British royal family to convert to Catholicism for more than 300 years
 Joyce Kilmer: American journalist, poet, literary critic, lecturer and editor
 Yuna Kim: South Korean figure skater and Olympic gold medalist
 Russell Kirk: American historian, moralist and figure in US Conservatism
 Sister Gregory Kirkus: English Roman Catholic nun, educator, historian and archivist
 Harm Klueting: priest and historian; had been Lutheran and had two children
Ronald Knox: English Catholic priest, theologian, author, and radio broadcaster. Ordained an Anglican priest in 1912, Knox converted to Catholicism in 1917. He is known for his translation of the bible, the Knox Bible, published in 1955 
 Dean Koontz: American novelist known for thrillers and suspense; converted in college
 Knud Karl Krogh-Tonning: Norwegian; had been a Lutheran professor of theology
 Albert Küchler: Danish painter who became a Franciscan friar
 Lawrence Kudlow: CNBC host and business columnist
 Sigiswald Kuijken: Belgian violinist, violist and conductor
 William Kurelek: Canadian painter
 Stephan Kuttner: expert in canon law
 Demetrios Kydones: Byzantine theologian, writer and statesman

L
 Shia LaBeouf: American actor, performance artist, and filmmaker; converted following an extended period preparing for a role playing Padre Pio
 Charlie Landsborough: singer songwriter
 Karl Landsteiner: Austrian biologist and physician; received the 1930 Nobel Prize in Physiology or Medicine; converted from Judaism to Roman Catholicism in 1890
 Joseph Lane: Territorial Governor of Oregon; first U.S. Senator from Oregon; pro-slavery Democratic candidate for US Vice President in 1860; openly sympathetic to the Confederacy during the Civil War; studied Catholic doctrine and converted with his family in 1867
John Lawe, Wisconsin Territory fur trader and land magnate. Lawe, who was of Jewish background, was baptised a Protestant, and had served as vestryman and treasurer of Wisconsin's first Episcopalian church, was reported to have made a deathbed conversion to Catholicism, and was buried in a Catholic cemetery next to his wife Thérèse. Local speculation was that the purpose of his conversion was to allow this burial.
 Halldór Laxness: Icelandic writer; received the 1955 Nobel Prize in Literature; converted in 1923; left the Church, but returned at the end of his life
 Graham Leonard: former Anglican Bishop of London
 Ignace Lepp: French psychiatrist whose parents were freethinkers; joined the Communist party at age fifteen; broke with the party in 1937 and eventually became a Catholic priest
 Shane Leslie: Irish-born diplomat and writer. He was a first cousin of Winston Churchill
 Dilwyn Lewis: Welsh clothes designer and priest
 Li Yingshi: Ming-era Chinese military officer and a renowned mathematician, astrologer and feng shui expert, who was among the first Chinese literati to become Christian
 Francis Libermann: venerated Catholic, raised in Orthodox Judaism; has been called "the second founder of the Holy Ghost Fathers"
 Antonio Ligabue: Italian painter of Swiss birth
Luca Lionello: being an atheist for 40 years, this Italian actor converted when he was part of the cast of the 2004 epic drama The Passion of the Christ, playing Judas Ischkariot 
 William Lockhart: first member of the Oxford Movement to convert and become a Catholic priest
 James Longstreet: Confederate general turned Republican "scalawag"
 Frederick Lucas: Quaker who converted and founded The Tablet
 Clare Boothe Luce: American playwright, editor, politician, and diplomat; wife of Time-Life founder Henry Luce;worked on the screenplay of the nun-themed film Come to the Stable; became a Dame of Malta
 Arnold Lunn: skier, mountaineer, and writer; agnostic; wrote Roman Converts, which took a critical view of Catholicism and the converts to it; later converted to Catholicism due to debating with converts, and became an apologist for the faith
 Jean-Marie Lustiger: Roman Catholic Archbishop of Paris, 1981-2005; a Cardinal
 James Patterson Lyke: Roman Catholic Archbishop of Atlanta, 1991-1992
 Jan Lipsansky: Czech writer

M
 Alasdair MacIntyre: virtue ethicist and moral philosopher
 Gustav Mahler: Austrian composer; converted from Judaism.  There is disagreement whether his conversion was a genuine or pragmatic one to overcome institutional and professional barriers against Jews
 Enrique de Malaca: Malay slave of Ferdinand Magellan; converted to Roman Catholicism after being purchased in 1511
 Henry Edward Manning: English Anglican clergyman who became a Catholic Cardinal and Archbishop of Westminster
 Gabriel Marcel: leading Christian existentialist; his upbringing was agnostic
 Jacques Maritain: French Thomist philosopher; helped form the basis for international law and human rights law in his writings; also laid the intellectual foundation for the Christian democratic movement
 Taylor Marshall: American former Anglican priest, now a Catholic author and YouTuber/podcaster.
 Tobie Matthew: Member of English Parliament who became a Catholic priest
 Robert L. May: creator of Rudolph the Red-Nosed Reindeer; converted from Judaism after marrying his second wife, a Catholic.
 James McAuley: Australian poet; converted in 1952
 Claude McKay: bisexual Jamaican poet; went from Communist-leaning atheist to an active Catholic Christian after a stroke
 Gavin McInnes: Canadian far-right activist. Founder of the Proud Boys.
 Marshall McLuhan: Canadian philosopher of communication theory; coined the terms "the medium is the message" and "global village"; converted in 1937 after reading the works of G.K. Chesterton
 Thomas Merton: American Trappist monk and spiritual writer
 Vittorio Messori: Italian journalist and writer called the "most translated Catholic writer in the world" by Sandro Magister; before his conversion in 1964 he had a "perspective as a secularist and agnostic"
 Alice Meynell: poet and suffragist
 Czesław Miłosz: poet, prose writer, translator and diplomat; awarded the Neustadt International Prize for Literature and the 1980 Nobel Prize in Literature
 John Brande Morris: priest, writer, student of Patristic theology, and scholar of the Syriac language
 Henry Morse: one of the Forty Martyrs of England and Wales
 Malcolm Muggeridge: British journalist and author who went from agnosticism to the Catholic Church
 William Munk: English physician and medical historian remembered chiefly for "Munk's Roll", a biographical reference work on the Royal College of Physicians.

N
 Takashi Nagai: physician specializing in radiology; author of The Bells of Nagasaki
 Bernard Nathanson: Jewish convert and medical doctor; a founding member of NARAL; he later recanted and became an anti-abortion proponent
Michael Nazir-Ali: Anglican Bishop of Rochester from 1994 to 2009. Currently the director of the Oxford Centre for Training, Research, Advocacy and Dialogue. Converted to Catholicism in 2021, ordained a priest for the Anglican Ordinariate
 Patricia Neal: won the Academy Award for Best Actress for her role in Hud
 Knut Ansgar Nelson: Danish-born convert who was a bishop of the Roman Catholic Diocese of Stockholm
 Irène Némirovsky: author of the controversial David Golder, autobiographical Le Vin de solitude, and posthumous success Suite française
 Richard John Neuhaus: priest; founder and editor of the journal First Things
 John Henry Newman: English priest and cardinal, former Anglican priest, famous for his autobiographical book Apologia Pro Vita Sua in which he details his reasons for converting
 Keith Newton: formerly an Anglican bishop
 Donald Nicholl: British historian and theologian who has been described as "one of the most widely influential of modern Christian thinkers"
 Barthold Nihus: German convert who became a bishop and controversialist
 Robert Novak: American journalist and political commentator; raised Jewish, but practiced no religion for many years before converting to Catholicism in the last years of his life
 Alfred Noyes: English poet, best known for "The Highwayman"; dealt with his conversion in The Unknown God; The Last Voyage, in his The Torch-Bearers trilogy, was influenced by his conversion

O
 Frederick Oakeley: priest and author known for his translation of "Adeste Fideles" into English as "O Come, All Ye Faithful"
 John M. Oesterreicher: Jewish convert who became a monsignor and a leading advocate of Jewish-Catholic reconciliation
 William E. Orchard: liturgist, pacifist and ecumenicist; before becoming a Catholic priest he was a Protestant minister
 Johann Friedrich Overbeck: German painter in the Nazarene movement of religious art

P
 Paul the Apostle: a well known figure of persecuting the Early Church, claimed a powerful conversion based on an apparition of Jesus of Nazareth
 Coventry Patmore: English poet and critic known for The Angel in the House
 Joseph Pearce: anti-Catholic and agnostic British National Front member; became a devoted Catholic writer with a series on EWTN
 Vladimir Pecherin: Russian convert and priest whose memoirs were controversial for criticizing both the Russian government and the Catholic Church of his time
 Charles Péguy: French poet, essayist, and editor; went from an agnostic humanist to a pro-Republic Catholic
 Walker Percy: Laetare Medal-winning author of The Moviegoer and Love in the Ruins
 Sarah Peter: American philanthropist; daughter of Ohio governor Thomas Worthington
 Johann Pistorius: German controversialist and historian
 John Hungerford Pollen: wrote for The Tablet; Professor of Fine Arts at the Catholic University of Ireland
 Ramesh Ponnuru: American conservative political pundit and journalist
 Kirsten Powers: American political analyst & fox news columnist.
 Agni Pratistha: Indonesian actress, model and former beauty queen; elected Puteri Indonesia 2006; converted to Catholicism after marriage, although initially denied rumors of conversion
 Vincent Price: American actor; converted to Catholicism to marry his third wife, Australian actress Coral Browne (she became an American citizen for him); he reportedly lost interest in the faith after her death
 Erik Prince: founder of Blackwater Worldwide
 Augustus Pugin: English-born architect, designer and theorist of design; known for Gothic Revival architecture; advocate for reviving the Catholic Church in England

R
 Brent Robbins: Associate Professor of Psychology at Point Park University in Pittsburgh, Pennsylvania
 Marie-Alphonse Ratisbonne: co-founder of the Congregation of Our Lady of Sion, which originally worked to convert Jewish people like himself
 Marie Theodor Ratisbonne: co-founder of the Congregation of Our Lady of Sion; converted before his brother
 Sally Read: Eric Gregory Award-winning poet who converted to Catholicism
 Joseph Warren Revere: American Union army General and grandson of Paul Revere; converted in 1862 during the Civil War
 William Reynolds: English Roman Catholic theologian and Biblical scholar
 Dewi Rezer: Indonesian model of French descent; converted to Roman Catholicism
 Anthony Rhodes: English writer
 Paul Richardson: formerly an Anglican bishop
 Knute Rockne: Norwegian-American Notre Dame football coach, 1918-1930; converted from Lutheranism
 Alban Roe: Benedictine; one of the Forty Martyrs of England and Wales
 Lila Rose: American president of anti-abortion organization Live Action
 Sylvester Horton Rosecrans: first bishop of the Roman Catholic Diocese of Columbus
 William Rosecrans: Sylvester's brother, a Union Army general in the American Civil War
 Anthony Ross: Scottish priest who served as Rector of the University of Edinburgh from 1979 to 1982
 Jonathan Roumie: American actor best known for playing the role of Jesus Christ in television series The Chosen
 Joseph Rovan: historian, member of the French Resistance, adviser on Franco-German relations
 Giuni Russo: Italian singer-songwriter, developed a devotion to Saint Teresa of Avila
 Richard Rutt: Catholic Monsignor, member of the House of Lords, served as a missionary to Korea and as Bishop of Daejon in the Anglican Church of Korea and the Suffragan Bishop of Turo in the Church of England, prominent Korean Studies Scholar

S
 Nazli Sabri: Queen of Egypt; mother of King Farouk of Egypt
 Siegfried Sassoon:  English poet, writer and soldier; converted in 1957
 Joseph Saurin: French mathematician and Calvinist minister
 Paul Schenck: converted from Judaism to Episcopalianism to Catholicism; currently a Catholic priest and anti-abortion activist 
 Heinrich Schlier: German theologian
 Roy Schoeman: former Harvard Professor, lecturer, and Jewish convert to Catholicism
 Dutch Schultz (Arthur Flegenheimer): American mobster; converted to Catholicism during his second trial, convinced that Jesus Christ had spared him jail time; after being fatally shot by underworld rivals, he asked to see a priest and was given the last rites; his mother insisted on dressing him in a Jewish prayer shawl prior to his interment in the Catholic Gate of Heaven Cemetery
 E. F. Schumacher: economic thinker known for Small Is Beautiful; his A Guide for the Perplexed criticizes what he termed "materialistic scientism;" went from atheism to Buddhism to Catholicism
 Countess of Ségur: French writer of Russian birth
 John Sergeant: English priest, controversialist and theologian
 Elizabeth Ann Seton: first native-born citizen of the United States to be canonized by the Roman Catholic Church
 Frances Shand Kydd: mother of Diana, Princess of Wales
 Michael Alphonsius Shen Fu-Tsung: Qing Dynasty bureaucrat who toured Europe; he was featured in a painting titled "The Chinese Convert" by Godfrey Kneller
 Frank Sheed: Australian-born lawyer, writer, publisher, Catholic apologist and speaker. Raised by a Scottish Presbyterian father, he later converted at age 16, and devoted his life to defending the Catholic faith, mostly from Protestant critics.
 William Tecumseh Sherman: Civil War General, was born into a Presbyterian family but raised in a Catholic household by foster parents after his father died. Sherman attended the Catholic Church until the outbreak of the Civil War, which destroyed his faith. His wife and children were Catholic and one son, Thomas Ewing Sherman, became a Jesuit priest.
 Ralph Sherwin: one of the Forty Martyrs of England and Wales
 Frederick Charles Shrady: American religious artist, primarily of sculpture
 Angelus Silesius: German Catholic priest and physician, known as a mystic and religious poet
 David Silk: formerly an Anglican bishop
 Richard Simpson: literary writer and scholar; wrote a biography of Edmund Campion
 Edith Sitwell: British poet and critic
 Delia Smith: English cook and television presenter; her books A Feast for Lent and A Feast for Advent involve Catholicism
 Timo Soini: politician who leads the Eurosceptic True Finns party; converted during the time of Pope John Paul II
Lauren Southern: Canadian political activist and YouTuber.
 Reinhard Sorge: expressionist playwright who went from Nietzschean to Catholic
 Wesley Sneijder: Dutch soccer player
 Etsuro Sotoo: Japanese sculptor
 Muriel Spark: Scottish novelist, author of The Prime of Miss Jean Brodie; Penelope Fitzgerald states that Spark said that after her conversion she was better able to, "see human existence as a whole, as a novelist needs to do"
Britney Spears:  American singer, songwriter, dancer, and actress. Was raised Baptist before converting in 2021
 Ignatius Spencer: son of George Spencer, 2nd Earl Spencer; became a Passionist priest and worked for the conversion of England to the Catholic faith
 Adrienne von Speyr: Swiss medical doctor and later Catholic mystic
 Henri Spondanus: French jurist, historian, continuator of the Annales Ecclesiastici, and Bishop of Pamiers
 Barbara Stanwyck: American actress, model, and dancer
 Friedrich Staphylus: German theologian who drew up several opinions on reform for the Council of Trent despite not attending
 Ellen Gates Starr: a founder of Hull House who became an Oblate of the Third Order of St. Benedict
 Jeffrey N. Steenson: first ordinary to the Personal Ordinariate of the Chair of Saint Peter; former bishop of the Episcopal Diocese of the Rio Grande
 Edith Stein: phenomenologist Jewish philosopher who converted to Catholicism and then became a Discalced Carmelite nun; declared a saint by John Paul II
 Göran Stenius: Swedish-Finnish writer whose Klockorna i Rom (The Bells of Rome) has been praised as a post-war religious novel
 Nicolas Steno: pioneer in geology and anatomy who converted from Lutheranism; became a bishop, wrote spiritual works, and was beatified in 1988
 Karl Stern: German-Canadian neurologist and psychiatrist; his book Pillar of Fire concerns his conversion
 John Lawson Stoddard: divinity student who became an agnostic and "scientific humanist;" later converted to Catholicism
 Sven Stolpe: Swedish convert and writer
 R. J. Stove: Australian writer, editor, and composer; raised atheist as the son of David Stove
 Su Xuelin: Chinese author and scholar whose semi-autobiographical novel Bitter Heart discusses her introduction to and conversion to Catholicism
 Graham Sutherland: English artist who did religious art and had a fascination with Christ's crucifixion
 Halliday Sutherland: doctor, tuberculosis pioneer, best-selling author and defendant in the 1923 libel trial, Stopes v. Sutherland. Converted in 1919.
 Robert Sutton: English priest and martyr
 Sophie Swetchine: Russian salon-holder and mystic
 Susie Forrest Swift (Sister M. Imelda Teresa; 1862–1916), American editor, Salvation Army worker, Catholic nun
 Karel Schulz: Czech writer

T
 John B. Tabb: American poet, priest, and educator
Hara Takashi ( 原 敬): Japanese politician who served as the Prime Minister of Japan from 1918 to 1921. Baptized at the age of 17
 John Michael Talbot: American Roman Catholic singer-songwriter-guitarist, once a secular musician in the group Mason Proffit
 Allen Tate: American poet, essayist and social commentator, and Poet Laureate Consultant in Poetry to the Library of Congress
 Frances Margaret Taylor: founded the Poor Servants of the Mother of God
 Kateri Tekakwitha: Catholic saint informally known as "Lily of the Mohawks"
 Tabaraji of Ternate: Indonesian sultan; converted to Roman Catholicism after 1534; baptised with the name Dom Manuel
 Elliot Griffin Thomas: third bishop for the Roman Catholic Diocese of Saint Thomas
 John Sparrow David Thompson: first Catholic to be Prime Minister of Canada
 Meletius Tipaldi: Eastern Catholic bishop, from Orthodox Christianity.
 Alice B. Toklas: American-born member of the Parisian avant-garde of the early 20th century; had once been Gertrude Stein's lover
 Edith Tolkien: Englishwoman, known as the wife and muse of novelist J. R. R. Tolkien. Converted in 1913 in order to marry her husband
Mabel Tolkien: Mother of English writer, poet, philologist, and academic J. R. R. Tolkien. Converted from being a Baptist in 1900
 Meriol Trevor: British biographer, novelist and children's writer
 Lou Tseng-Tsiang: Chinese Premier and diplomat who became a Benedictine abbot and priest "Pierre-Célestin"
 Hasekura Tsunenaga: Samurai and Keichō diplomat who toured Europe
 Rajah Tupas: Filipino prince and son of the Rajah Humabon; converted with his family by Magellan
 Malcolm Turnbull: 29th Prime Minister of Australia.
 Julia Gardiner Tyler: second wife of U.S. President John Tyler

U
 Barry Ulanov: editor of Metronome magazine; a founder of the St. Thomas More Society; Mary Lou Williams's godfather
 Kaspar Ulenberg: theological writer and translator of the Bible who had previously been Lutheran
 Sigrid Undset: Norwegian Nobel laureate who had previously been agnostic

V
 Sheldon Vanauken: author of A Severe Mercy; a contributing editor of the New Oxford Review
 J. D. Vance: American author and venture capitalist known for his memoir Hillbilly Elegy
 Bill Veeck: American baseball team owner
 Johann Emanuel Veith: Bohemian Roman Catholic preacher
 Jean-Baptiste Ventura: soldier, mercenary and adventurer of Jewish origin
 Aubrey Thomas de Vere: Victorian era poet and critic. 
 Johannes Vermeer: Dutch Golden Age painter
 Adrian Vermeule: American legal scholar and law professor at Harvard Law School
 Mother Veronica of the Passion: founder of the Sisters of the Apostolic Carmel
 Karl Freiherr von Vogelsang: politician and editor of the Catholic newspaper Das Vaterland
 Simeon Vratanja: Eastern Catholic bishop

W
 The Empress Dowager Wang of the Southern Ming Dynasty and mother of the Yongli Emperor
 William George Ward: theologian, philosopher, lecturer in mathematics
E. I. Watkin: English writer on poetry, philosophy, aesthetics, history, and religion. Friend of Christopher Dawson. Converted in 1908 from Anglicanism
 Evelyn Waugh: English writer; his Brideshead Revisited concerns an aristocratic Catholic family
 John Wayne: American actor, known for his roles in war films and Westerns; converted to the Catholic Church shortly before his death.
 Ben Weasel: American musician, lead singer and guitarist of the punk rock band Screeching Weasel; he converted from Buddhism.
 Zacharias Werner: German poet, dramatist and preacher
 Eustace White: one of the Forty Martyrs of England and Wales
 E. T. Whittaker: English mathematician who was awarded the cross Pro Ecclesia et Pontifice in 1935
 Ann Widdecombe: former British Conservative Party politician; novelist since 2000
 Chelsea Olivia Wijaya: Indonesian actress and model; born in the Protestant religion
 Robert William Wilcox: soldier and politician in 19th century Hawaii.
 Oscar Wilde: Irish writer and poet; converted on his deathbed
 Mary Lou Williams: jazz pianist; after conversion, wrote and performed some religious jazz music like Black Christ of the Andes
 Paul Williams: academic who was raised Anglican and lived as a Tibetan Buddhist for twenty years before becoming Catholic
 Tennessee Williams: American playwright; converted in his later years as his life spiralled downwards
 Sigi Wimala: Indonesian model and actress, converted to Catholicism after marriage
 Lord Nicholas Windsor: son of Catholic convert Katharine, Duchess of Kent; anti-abortion writer
 Gene Wolfe: Damon Knight Memorial Grand Master in science fiction and fantasy
 John Woodcock: among the Eighty-five martyrs of England and Wales
 Thomas Woods: American historian and Austrian School economist; wrote How the Catholic Church Built Western Civilization
 John Ching Hsiung Wu: wrote Chinese Humanism and Christian spirituality; has been called "one of China's chief lay exponents of Catholic ideas"
 Wu Li: Chinese painter and poet who became one of the first Chinese Jesuit priests
 John C. Wright: science fiction author who went from atheist to Catholic; wrote Chapter 1 of the book Atheist to Catholic: 11 Stories of Conversion, edited by Rebecca Vitz Cherico
 John Michael Wright: portrait painter in the Baroque style

X
 Xu Guangqi: Chinese scholar-bureaucrat, agricultural scientist, astronomer, and mathematician during the Ming Dynasty; classed as one of the Three Pillars of Chinese Catholicism

Y
 Shigeru Yoshida (吉田 茂): Japanese diplomat and politician who served as Prime Minister of Japan from 1946 to 1947 and from 1948 to 1954. He was baptized on his deathbed, having hid his Catholicism throughout most of his life. His funeral was held in St. Mary's Cathedral, Tokyo

Z
 Israel Zolli: until converting from Judaism to Catholicism in February 1945, Zolli was the chief rabbi in Rome, Italy's Jewish community from 1940 to 1945

Former Catholics who had been converts
 Magdi Allam: converted in 2008, but left in 2013 to protest what he deemed its "globalism", "weakness", and "soft stance against Islam"
 Margaret Anna Cusack: Anglican nun who converted to Catholicism; founded The Sisters of St. Joseph of Peace, and later left due to conflict with a bishop; later became a critic of the Church's hierarchy and the Society of Jesus; her order survived in the Catholic Church
 Rod Dreher: writer and blogger; raised Methodist before converting to Catholicism; converted to Eastern Orthodoxy in 2006
 Henry Ford II: converted by Archbishop Fulton J. Sheen; twice divorced; later ceased practicing the faith, although he received the last rites of the Catholic Church on his deathbed; his funeral was Episcopalian
 Ernest Hemingway: Converted to marry his second wife, Pauline Pfeiffer. He subsequently divorced Pfeiffer and ceased practicing the faith. He received Catholic graveside services because his family requested it. Also, the fact that his death was a suicide was concealed initially. Ex-Catholics and people who committed suicide were not buried according to Catholic rites.
 Ammon Hennacy: Christian anarchist and activist who was Catholic from 1952 to 1965; his essay "On Leaving the Catholic Church" concerns his formal renunciation of the religion
 David Kirk: Baptist by upbringing; converted to the Melkite Greek Catholic Church in 1953 and became a Melkite priest in 1964; became Eastern Orthodox in 2004
 Otto Klemperer: German conductor. Converted to Catholicism, but returned to Judaism near the end of his life.
 Robert Lowell: United States Poet Laureate Consultant in Poetry who won the Pulitzer Prize for Poetry twice; left the faith by 1951
 Walter M. Miller, Jr.: author of A Canticle for Leibowitz; converted after his experiences in World War II; later renounced the faith
 Jean-Jacques Rousseau: Franco-Swiss philosopher, writer and political theorist who converted to Catholicism as a young man but later apostated to Calvinism in 1754

See also
 Converts to Roman Catholicism from Anglicanism 
 Converts to Roman Catholicism from atheism and agnosticism
 Converts to Roman Catholicism from Islam
 Converts to Roman Catholicism from Judaism

Main articles
 Religious conversion
Deathbed conversion
 Secondary conversion

Catholicism-related lists
 List of Roman Catholic Church artists
 List of Catholic authors
 List of Catholic philosophers and theologians

References

External links
 Historic Catholic Converts to Catholicism Produced by EWTN hosted by Fr. Charles Connor – Real Audio

Catholicism
Converts